The Guitar Hero: On Tour series is an expansion of the Guitar Hero series for the Nintendo DS portable console. The series is developed by Vicarious Visions and published by RedOctane and Activision.  The game uses a "Guitar Grip" hardware unit that fits into the Game Boy Advance slot on the DS or DS Lite to recreate the experience of the console-based guitar controllers normally used with the game; this unit is incompatible with the Nintendo DSi and Nintendo 3DS due to the lack of the slot on the DSi hardware. The player uses fret buttons on the Grip while "strumming" using a stylus across the DS touchscreen to try to match notes as they scroll on the second screen in order to score points and complete each song.

There are three titles in the series: Guitar Hero: On Tour, Guitar Hero On Tour: Decades, and Guitar Hero On Tour: Modern Hits.  Each game features a setlist with more than 25 songs, most based on master recordings. The games utilize the DS's local wireless features to allow two players to compete against each other. Players can compete using different versions of the games, allowing the songs of each game to be shared during play.  The songs chosen in the setlists of all three games have significantly less objectionable content than the ones in mainstream console Guitar Hero titles, making the On Tour series the first and only games in the series to be rated Everyone 10+ by the ESRB.

Guitar Hero: On Tour setlist
Guitar Hero: On Tour features two different setlists, one for primarily English-speaking regions including North America, the British Isles, and Australia, in addition to Japan and the Netherlands, and another for other non-English-speaking European countries, with five replacement songs; songs not in the game for that region are marked as "N/A" in the table below. Both setlists include 26 licensed tracks including five bonus tracks, with about 85% of them being master recordings; all other songs are cover versions recreated for the game.  Twenty songs from the North American setlist were exclusive to this version of Guitar Hero upon release while the remaining six songs have been used throughout the series. Freezepops "I Am Not Your Gameboy" is a bonus song that is unlocked by completing all the Guitar Duels on any difficulty in the game. Years in the table below reflect the year the song was recorded. Song in the game are presented as a series of tiers of increasing difficulty, requiring the player to complete the songs in each tier before the next tier is unlocked.

The setlist received a lukewarm reception. Game Informer stated that, compared to the setlists for other Guitar Hero games, the songs "skew away from great guitar rock and into the territory of pop/rock", and "just aren't as exciting to play". IGN commented that the setlist was "a little debatable" and "clearly being aimed at a friendlier, mainstream, pop-friendly crowd".

Guitar Hero On Tour: Decades setlist
Decades'''s setlist is considered "a trek through time" by IGN, featuring sets of five songs out of a total of twenty-eight tracks. Each set focuses on a specific era of rock music, including two called "2000s" and "Modern".  Each set has a specialized venue for the era. Once all the songs in the set are completed, the player is presented with a final encore song for that set while also unlocking the next set. Additional bonus tracks are unlocked for completing specific requirements in the game. All songs are master recordings as opposed to cover versions used in the previous game. The full setlist for the game is listed below.  The setlists are different for the North American, UK, and European releases. Seven songs in each are exclusive to the respective versions, and are listed as "N/A" when not available for that region's release.

The Decades setlist was considered to be an improvement over the original On Tour, with more songs that would be "much more appealing to fans" of the console versions of Guitar Hero". IGN felt that the setlist "starts out bad but starts getting more enjoyable as you unlock the earlier decades".

Guitar Hero On Tour: Modern Hits setlistModern Hitss setlist features songs released since 2000.  The full setlist features 28 songs, all based on master recordings. Like the previous game in the series, On Tour: Decades, the set list is different for the North American, UK, and European releases with twelve exclusive tracks in each of the respective versions (the European release has eight exclusive tracks that are the same as the UK version and four other tracks from Europe).

The Modern Hits'' setlist is said to cover "guitar-heavy hits from the past five years" with "plenty of noteworthy songs", and considered to be a "compelling blend of tracks".

References

On Tour